An Ocean of Minutes is a 2018 Canadian novel by Thea Lim.

Set in an alternate version of 1981 where the world was overtaken by a viral flu pandemic and time travel is made possible shortly thereafter the novel follows a young American couple, Polly and Frank, who are forced to separate when one is infected with the flu and the other travels into the future.

The novel was nominated for the 2018 Giller Prize.

Summary
In 1981 Polly Nader and her boyfriend Frank Marino are on vacation when a devastating flu pandemic grinds the world to a halt. Shortly after it is revealed that time travel is possible. Initially created in an attempt to stop the pandemic the time travel falls short of reaching patient zero by a matter of months. The system becomes managed by TimeRaiser, a company which sends people from 1981 into the future but severely limits people's ability to travel to the past. When Polly learns that Frank is sick and they cannot afford medication she decides to apply for a visa to work for TimeRaiser so that he can have insurance and access to medication. They make plans to meet in 1993 but when Polly wakes up she discovers she has been rerouted to 1998.

In 1998 Polly discovers that shortly after she travelled into the future scientists sent vaccines to cure the flu to 1981. This resulted in the flu morphing into something more viral and deadly. In the ensuing pandemic the states split with the Northern ones enforcing a strict quarantine on the South. After the government fell the country decided to permanently split with the Northern ones retaining the name the United States of America while the southern ones reform as America. Polly is now a Journeyman i.e. a conditional citizen of America sent from the past to the future, and is trapped in Galveston.

Polly works as a furniture restorer under the instruction of the alcoholic Henry Baird who is struggling since he was left with a similar choice as Polly but instead chose to let his long-term boyfriend die. During their time together Polly tries to befriend him for information eventually agreeing to steal a package containing his boyfriend's high school yearbook, valuable to TimeRaiser because his boyfriend went to school with Elvis Presley, in exchange for Baird going to Polly's meet up point with Frank. The meet up is unsuccessful and Baird eventually sets Polly up to take the fall for the theft on her own. Her visa status is then downgraded and more time added to her bond.

At Polly's new job she has no privacy but is able to make friends by sharing what little information she has. Her friends offer to let her live with them in an illegal encampment where workers are squatting in dilapidated houses. While Polly initially accepts the offer she is offered a different opportunity from Noberto, the American landlord who was friendly to her at her previous job. He offers to marry her and let her stay in his accommodations pretending they are trying for a child. In exchange he will help her find Frank. After he provides information that Frank searched for Polly three times, in 1993, 1995 and 1997, Polly accepts Noberto's offer.

Polly and Noberto achieve a kind of peace together but after a while Noberto reveals that the fixer who was supposed to help him with the evidence of his marriage absconded with the paperwork. Noberto then attempts to rape Polly, hoping to impregnate her, but she is able to fend him off by hitting him over the head with a lamp. Believing she has killed him Polly is wracked with guilt but eventually she learns Noberto is alive when she discovers that, using funds from the sale of his house, he has paid her way out of bondage and bought her a ticket to the U.S. to atone for his attempted rape.

After making the voyage out of America, Polly is shocked to learn that unlike America, the U.S. has a thriving, self-sufficient economy. Using the address Noberto gave her she is finally able to meet Frank but learns almost immediately that not only did he not wait for her he has a 14-year-old daughter. To Polly's relief her aunt Donna is still alive and well-looked after thanks to Frank who has become rich from his ex-wife's money. Polly lives with Donna, grieving the loss of her life.

On January 1, 2000, early in the morning Polly goes to walk Donna's dog and runs into Frank who admits he has been avoiding her out of guilt and shame. He reveals that he connected with his daughter's mother less than two years after Polly left and that while he did attempt to search for Polly his searches stopped due to the divorce proceedings with his ex-wife. The two get a hotel room but Polly finds she cannot be sexually intimate with Frank and accepts that he is too different from the Frank of 1981. The two part on more amicable terms.

Reception
The novel received positive to mixed reviews. The Toronto Star called the novel "a devastating debut" and it received a starred review from Publishers Weekly and was featured as a pick of the week. Kirkus Reviews called the novel "beautiful". Quill & Quire described the main characters as "difficult to root for". The Irish Times took note of the novel's "fresh perspective on the complexity of migration and displacement" but complained that aspects of the novel felt rushed, yet praised Lim's "ability to create a vibrant world".

Maclean's highlighted the novel as one of their 15 novels of the summer and called it "an ambitious novel". The Globe & Mail listed the novel in their top 100 books of 2018.

Awards
The novel was shortlisted for the 2018 Giller Prize and the ALA Reading List for Science Fiction. It was longlisted as one of the books featured on the 2019 Canada Reads program and was also longlisted for the 2019 Sunburst Award in the category of Adult Fiction.

References

Novels about time travel
2018 Canadian novels
2018 science fiction novels
Novels set in Texas
American alternate history novels
Fiction set in 1998
Viking Press books